Cytaeididae is a family of cnidarians belonging to the order Anthoathecata.

Genera:
 Cytaeis Eschscholtz, 1829
 Paracytaeis Bouillon, 1978
 Perarella Stechow, 1922
 Stylactella Haeckel, 1889

References

 
Filifera
Cnidarian families